The Turkvision Song Contest 2020 was the fourth edition of the Turkvision Song Contest. It took place in Istanbul, Turkey, with performances filmed remotely, and organised by Turkish Music Box Television (TMB TV).

The contest took place on 20 December 2020. Twenty-six Turkic regions, which have either a large Turkic population or a widely spoken Turkic language, participated in the contest.

 won the contest with the song "Tikenli yol" performed by Natalie Papazoglu.  and  placed second and third respectively, with Yakutia, Bosnia and Herzegovina,  and  achieving their highest placings in the contest to date.

Background
Prior to 2020, the Turkvision Song Contest had not been held since 2015. A fourth edition was initially planned for 2016, to be hosted at the Yahya Kemal Beyatli Cultural Centre in Istanbul, but it was cancelled (ostensibly due to the Istanbul bombings throughout 2016). Several of the songs competing in the 2020 contest were originally set to compete in the cancelled 2016 contest.

In October 2020, it was reported that TMB TV would host an online-only version of the contest from Istanbul.

Format
All performances were intended to be filmed by 15 November 2020 (although several participants filmed their entries after that date), with participants either chosen by national/regional broadcasters or through submitting their entries directly.

Voting
The jury was composed of one person per participating region, chosen by their region's head of delegation. Each juror scored every song from 0 to 10 points, and the song with the most points won. The jurors awarded their points via satellite link, and the chair of the jury was Belarusian singer Gunesh, who previously finished as runner-up for her country at the 2013 contest. The top three entrants will receive cash prizes, and the winner will receive a direct invitation to the Turkvision Song Contest 2021 in Shusha, Azerbaijan and the opportunity to film a music video for their entry. There was also an audience sympathy prize for the "Sari Gelin" cover that received the most votes on the contest website.

Jurors

 – Avni Qahili
 – Kenan Çelik
 – Aigul Akhmadeeva
 – Gunesh 
 – Ahmed Švrakić
 – Petr Petkovic
 – Volkan Gucer
 Iraqi Turkmen – Ahmet Tuzlu 
 Kazakh Uyghurs – Polat Izimov
 – Marat Omarov
 – 
 – Gulnur Satylganova
 – Ivan Kain
 – Leush Lyubich
 Nogai – Ayna Cherkesova
 – Erhan Hasip
 – Ertan Birinci
 – Dawid Szwajcowski
 – Cengiz Erhan Kutluakay 
 – Denis Mavrić
 – Damir Davletshin
 – 
 –
 – Kabirov Mansur Mannurovich
 – Nadezhda Malenkova
 – Chyskyyray

Participating regions
The contest took place on Sunday 20 December at 16:00 TRT. The following countries and regions participated in the contest:

Audience sympathy prize 
The audience sympathy prize is in the running between 14 of the national representatives, who each recorded a cover of the famous folk song "Sari Gelin". Moscow's cover, which received the most online votes, won the prize. Voting opened on 15 December 2020 and closed on 1 January 2021. The following countries and artists competed:

  – 
  – Ziliya Bahtieva
  – Yulia Arnaut
  – 
  Iraqi Turkmen – Sarmad Mahmood
  – Aiganysh Abdieva
  – Olga Shimanskaya 
  – Cengiz Sipahi
  – Çağıl İşgüzar
  – Mishelle
  – Sunai Giolacai
  – Diliya Ahmetshina
  – 
  – Natalie Papazoglu

Scoreboard 
The table below summarizes the point distribution as shown during the show. For each song, the official total score may sometimes differ from a direct sum of the individual scores received.

Other regions
  – The Netherlands had initially confirmed their participation in the 2020 contest with Elcan Rzayev as their representative with the song "Ana – Vətən". However, Rzayev withdrew from the competition, as he was to unable to film his entry due to COVID-19 restrictions in the Netherlands. The Netherlands' non-participation was confirmed by the release of the running order by the contest organisers.
  – Olga Shimanskaya was confirmed to be the representative of Russia in December 2020, but she was later changed to the entrant for Moscow.
  – Sweden had initially confirmed their participation at the 2020 contest with the singer  and the song "Dirçəliş". However, on 12 December 2020, it was announced that Sweden had withdrawn from the contest. According to Eurovoix World, it was due to the filmed performance not being up to the standards of the competition.

Broadcasters and commentators

Notes

References

External links
  

2020 in Turkey
Turkish music
2020
2020 song contests
December 2020 events in Turkey